The administrative divisions of Riga consists of six administrative entities: Central District, Kurzeme District, Latgale Suburb, Northern District, Vidzeme Suburb and Zemgale Suburb. Three entities were established 1 September 1941, and another three were established in October 1969. There are no official lower level administrative units, but the Riga City Council Development Agency is working on a plan, which when officially confirmed, will mean that Riga will consist of 58 neighbourhoods. The current names were confirmed 28 December 1990.

Administrative divisions 

The city of Riga is divided into six administrative entities: Central, Kurzeme and Northern Districts and the Latgale, Vidzeme and Zemgale Suburbs. Three of these entities were established 1 September 1941, and were later called Proletariat, Kirov and Moscow districts (Vidzeme Suburb, Central District and Latgale Suburb). October 1969, further three districts were established, these were October, Lenin and Leningrad districts (Northern District, Zemgale Suburb and Kurzeme District). The current names of the six administrative entities of Riga were confirmed 28 December 1990 at the time of the Third Latvian National Awakening.

The most populated entity is Latgale Suburb with 197,166 inhabitants, and the least populated is Central District with 26,466 inhabitants.

Territorial divisions 

References